Rostered On is a single-camera Australian comedy web series focused on the retail staff of "Electroworld". It is directed and written by Ryan Chamley and produced by Robot Army.

The series was launched with a pilot episode on 4 April 2016 and a full series began exactly a year later on 4 April 2017 airing on Facebook and YouTube. In early 2017 the show was heavily promoted including the release of an extended trailer.

Netflix picked up the series and season 1 was available from 4 April 2018. Episodes previously available on YouTube and Facebook were removed. However, the show was removed from Netflix on 12 June 2022 and all episodes were subsequently made available again on Youtube.

A second season was commissioned by the Seven Network and screened on 7mate, the first narrative comedy commissioned for the channel. Season 1 also screened on 7mate in 2019.

Cast

Paul Moore as Shaun, a salesperson at Electroworld and aspiring photographer who is constantly fed up with working a thankless job.
Ronn Kurtz as Winston/Winno, a salesperson at Electroworld. Winston is kind-hearted, loveable and has a crush on Tess. 
Doug Lyons as Adam, Electroworld's 2IC, who is a stickler for the rules. 
Tara Vagg as Tess, the stores only Saleswoman, who has mutual feelings for Winston.  Tess was played by Georgie Jennings on the Pilot Episode.
Diana Brumen as Beeanka, one of the stores counter staff. Beeanka is mean, cold & manipulative.
Susie Kazda as Sarah, the stores other counter staff who is good friends with Beeanka.
Jack Garnett as Darren, the warehouse person who keeps to himself 
Stephen Francis as Gary, the store manager. Gary is friendly, and helps out whenever he can. Good friends with Shaun.
Lliam Murphy as Brett,  one of Electroworld's top salesman. Brett is a serial womaniser, and borderline sexist. In the season 2 premiere, he comes out as bisexual.
Adam Balales as Spencer, a salesperson who is good friends with Winston.
Steph Evison Williams as Sara, Shaun's loving wife who works at the cafe.
Sreed Sathiamoorthy as Vish, the resident security guard who is very confrontational, physical and has an unconventional method to dealing with customers.
Luke Saliba as Chris Woods, one of the company's regional managers who is the stereotypical outgoing retail Manager.
Christine Husband as Alison, one of the company's regional managers who tries to maintain order.
Nicholas Boshier as Dan, a new staff member introduced in season 2, who is living out of his car struggling to find a place to live.
Ace Howell as Montana, a barista at the cafe. Dan raised her as his un-biological daughter.
Jackson Tozer as Calvin, the new security guard introduced in season 2. He is carefree and eager to hang out with his colleagues.
Michael Mack as Clint, originally an angry customer in season 1, he returns as the head chef at the cafe in season 2.

Reception 
The Guardian gave it 2 stars, writing "You'd be hard-pressed to find anyone who'd consider the sleazy posturing of this Netflix relaunch good comedy" and criticized its "amateurish writing and bush-league production values".

Episodes

Season 1 (2016-2017)

Season 2 (2019)

Season 3 (2022)

References

External links

2016 Australian television series debuts
Australian television sitcoms
Australian mockumentary television series
Australian comedy web series
English-language television shows
7mate original programming